Guotai Junan Securities Co., Ltd. (GTJA) is one of the largest investment banks and securities companies in the People's Republic of China.

Overview
Guotai Junan Securities Co. Ltd., was established on August 18, 1999 after the merger of former Guotai Securities Co. Ltd. (founded on September 10, 1992) and Junan Securities Co. Ltd. (founded on August 25, 1992), currently with registered capital of RMB 6.1 billion.

Guotai Junan is among the leading Chinese investment banks in terms of business coverage, agency distribution and customers served. Guotai Junan has 5 subsidiaries: Guotai Junan International Holdings Ltd. (registered in Hong Kong), Guotai Junan Futures Co., Ltd., Shanghai Guotai Junan Securities Asset Management Co., Ltd., GTJA Innovation Investment Co., Ltd. and Guotai Junan Allianz Fund Management Co., Ltd. The company has set up 26 branches, 193 securities outlets in 30 provinces, municipalities and autonomous regions across China.

Innovation-wise, Guotai Junan has also been one of the Chinese financial industry's leaders. Its achievements have included: launching the first asset management business in 1993; being the first Mainland China securities company to initiate operations in Hong Kong in 1995; being the first among Chinese securities companies to establish a research institute in 1996; obtaining the first securities dealer qualification for agency share transfer and hosting offer in 2001. It was also among the first to have been approved to conduct QFII business in 2003; to serve as a primary dealer of the central bank open market, to become a market maker in the inter-bank bond market; being amongst the first companies that received QDII qualifications and financial futures business qualifications in 2007; taking the lead in getting the qualification for equity investment and futures IB business in 2008; obtaining the margin trading & securities lending qualification in 2010. In the same year, Guotai Junan International Holdings Limited, under the administration of Guotai Junan Financial Holding Co., Ltd. was listed in the Hong Kong Stock Exchange, becoming the first public enterprise under the ownership of a Mainland securities company in Hong Kong. In March 2011, Guotai Junan International Holdings was selected to become an Index constituent stock within the Hang Seng Hong Kong Composite Index, being the only constituent stock among the Chinese securities firms. 

Guotai Junan was one of the first Chinese securities companies engaged in a variety of financial services. It was the exclusive financial consultant in managing the overall listing of SAIC Group: the first A+H IPO; the first bond product with a guaranteed floating return; the first asset-backed security product; and, the first non-guaranteed local enterprise bond. It has also been the first to introduce quantitative investment concepts and trading strategies, managing the first hedge fund in China. Guotai Junan is the first investment bank conducting cross-border business and the first one to gain approval for RQFII. Junhong Wealth Club, one of the leading brands in Chinese wealth management, is also operated by the bank.

During 2004–2011, the company has been top-ranked in World Brand Lab-China's 500 Most Valuable Chinese Securities Brands. Between 2008–2012, it obtained Class A AA-level according to the securities classification of the China Securities Regulatory Commission for five consecutive years.

Structure

Guotai Junan Securities is a partially state-owned enterprise, headquartered in Shanghai. The company's international business is managed through its Hong Kong subsidiary, Guotai Junan International. The parent company includes the following subsidiaries: 

 Guotai Junan Financial Holdings Limited
 Guotai Junan Futures
 GTJA Innovation Investment
 Guotai Junan Asset Management
 Guotai Junan International

Business scope
 Brokerage
 Proprietary Investment
 Securities Underwriting and Sponsors
 Securities Investment Consultancy
 Finance Consultancy on Securities Investment and Trading
 Fund Distribution
 Margin Trading and Securities Lending
 IB for Futures Companies
 Asset Management (Subsidiary)
 Equity Investment (Subsidiary)
 Commodity/Financial Futures Brokerage (Subsidiary)
 Fund Management and Establishment (Subsidiary)
 Oversea Business (Subsidiary)
 Other business approved by China Securities Regulatory Commission

See also
Guotai Junan Futures
Yim Fung
Securities industry in China

References

External links
 Official site
 Guotai Junan Futures
 Guotai Junan Asset Management
 Gutoai Junan International

Companies in the CSI 100 Index
Companies listed on the Hong Kong Stock Exchange
Companies listed on the Shanghai Stock Exchange
H shares
Investment banks in China
Companies based in Shanghai
Financial services companies established in 1992